The 1934 Western Maryland Green Terror football team was an American football team that represented Western Maryland College (now known as McDaniel College) as an independent during the 1934 college football season. In its ninth season under head coach Dick Harlow, the team compiled an undefeated 8–0–1 record and shut out eight of its nine opponents. Left halfback and team captain Bill Shepherd led the country with 133 points scored and went on to play six years in the NFL. Harlow was later inducted into the College Football Hall of Fame.

Schedule

References

Western Maryland
McDaniel Green Terror football seasons
College football undefeated seasons
Western Maryland Green Terror football